Daqiao is a town in Dafeng District, Yancheng, Jiangsu province, China. , it has 13 villages under its administration.

See also 
 List of township-level divisions of Jiangsu

References 

Township-level divisions of Jiangsu
Yancheng